Joes is a census-designated place (CDP) and post office in and governed by Yuma County, Colorado, United States. The Joes post office has the ZIP Code 80822. At the United States Census 2010, the population of the Joes CDP was 80, while the population of the 80822 ZIP Code Tabulation Area was 260 including adjacent areas.

History
The Joes post office has been in operation since 1912. The community was named for the fact a share of the first settlers were named Joe.

Geography
Joes is home to Liberty High School.

Demographics

See also

 List of census-designated places in Colorado

References

 Propst, Nell B. (1988). The Boys From Joes: A Colorado Basketball Legend. Boulder, CO: Pruett Publishing.

External links

 Yuma County website

Census-designated places in Yuma County, Colorado
Census-designated places in Colorado